Laar is a surname. Notable people with the surname include:

Conrad Laar (1853–1929), German chemist
Getter Laar (born 1989), Estonian football player
Johannes van Laar (1860–1938), Dutch chemist
Mart Laar (born 1960), Estonian politician and historian
Roelof van Laar (born 1981), Dutch politician
Timothy Van Laar (born 1951), American artist and writer

See also 

 Laar, Lower Saxony, Germany

Dutch-language surnames
Estonian-language surnames
German-language surnames